Charles Wilson Nibley (February 5, 1849 – December 11, 1931) was the fifth presiding bishop of the Church of Jesus Christ of Latter-day Saints (LDS Church) between 1907 and 1925 and a member of the church's First Presidency from 1925 until his death.

Early life

Nibley was born in Hunterfield, Midlothian, Scotland to James Nibley and Jean Wilson. In 1855, his family moved to the United States to join with the main body of Latter-day Saints. They spent some time living in Rhode Island. In 1860, they moved to the Utah Territory. The family was sent north to settle in Cache Valley, and eventually settled in Wellsville.

As an adult, Nibley moved to Brigham City, Utah, where he worked for Morris Rosenbaum (a Jewish convert to Mormonism) and later became a partner in the store where he worked. It was there he met Rebecca Neibaur (who was the sister of one of Rosenbaum's wives) and was married in 1869. Following the 19th century practice of plural marriage, Nibley married Ellen Ricks in 1880 and Julia Budge in 1885.

Business ventures
In 1879 to 1885, Nibley managed a lumber company that was part of the LDS Church's United Order program. He then joined with David Eccles and George Stoddard to form the Oregon Lumber Company in 1889. As one of Nibley's grandsons, Hugh Nibley, related, Charles Nibley used economic tricks, including manipulating the Homestead Act to acquire large swaths of land, then would pay off government agents who investigated. Nibley was a firm believer in monopolies, believing competition was "economic waste". He also believed that LDS Church members who didn't support paying higher prices to Mormon businesses (versus lower prices to non-Mormon businesses) were betraying the church. This attitude of loyalty was also supported by Heber J. Grant in the October 1919 General Conference.

Nibley also became involved in railroads, insurance, banking, politics, and major agricultural endeavors, eventually becoming a multimillionaire. The sugar beet growing town of Nibley, Oregon was named for him. He was later instrumental in forming the Amalgamated Sugar Company and the Utah and Idaho Sugar Company (later known as U&I Sugar Co). He was chairman of the executive committee of the Utah-Idaho Sugar Company, President of the Standard Investors Inc. (comprising all of the Nibley holdings) and a valued director of the following business institutions: Zion's Cooperative Mercantile Institution, Utah State National Bank, Zion's Savings Bank & Trust Company, Utah Power & Light Company, Western Pacific Railroad Company, Hotel Utah, Utah Lime and Stone Company, Mountain States Telephone & Telegraph Company, and Beneficial Life Insurance Co.

Church service

Missions
Nibley served two missions for the LDS Church. His first mission, from October 1869 to March 1870, was to the eastern United States and was primarily a goodwill mission, trying to counteract the negative press surrounding polygamy in Utah. His second mission, from May 1877 to May 1879, was to England and proved to be influential to later Church history. He traveled with the new mission president, Joseph F. Smith, and while serving in England became good friends with the future Church president.

Stake Presidency
After Nibley had moved to Oregon to participate in the lumber business, an LDS stake was organized in the area, and Nibley was called as the first counselor in the stake presidency. He served from June 1901 to December 1907.

Presiding Bishop

Nibley was called as the presiding bishop of the Church of Jesus Christ of Latter-day Saints in December 1907 by Joseph F. Smith, with whom he had served in England a few decades earlier.  It was during Nibley's term as presiding bishop that the LDS Church built the Hotel Utah.

"Charles W. Nibley was one of the most liberal industrialists of his time. But he had to compromise. Thus to finish the Hotel Utah, it was necessary to borrow $2,000,000, so President Smith sent Brother Nibley to Barney Baruch in New York to raise the money. He succeeded, and President Smith was delighted; but he was also alarmed when he heard the terms: it would all have to be paid back in two years. "Charley, what have you done? How in the world will we ever pay it back in that time?" Not to worry, they would have the whole thing paid off in two years. How? "I'm going to build the largest and finest bar in the West in the basement of the Hotel, and will see that we will pay off every penny of that debt." President Smith went through the ceiling; which was it to be, the Word of Wisdom or fiscal soundness? The dollar won"

First Presidency
In 1925, he was released as presiding bishop and was asked to be second counselor to Heber J. Grant in the church's First Presidency. He is one of the few individuals to serve in the First Presidency without having been ordained to the priesthood office of apostle.

Nibley Park

In 1921 Nibley bought Wandamere (Calder) Park in Salt Lake City, and donated it to the city on Christmas Eve of that year. The gift to the city had the stipulation that it would never be sold and remain a golf course or be returned to the Nibley family. The idea was to provide a public golf course where the general public, both poor and rich, could enjoy the game of golf. At the dedication on May 22, 1922, Nibley said, "When I think that this generation and the generations of men and women yet to come shall find healthful enjoyment and rare pleasure here in playing that splendid outdoor Scotch game known as golf, and also in other outdoor amusements which shall not interfere with golf, that thought gives me the highest satisfaction and most genuine pleasure."

Death and legacy
Nibley died of pneumonia in Salt Lake City, Utah; he was buried in Logan City Cemetery. Nibley, Utah is named after him.

Charles's son Preston became a church leader and author of several Mormon books.  Hugh W. Nibley, a Mormon apologist and academic, is Charles's grandson, through his son, Alexander. Musician Reid Nibley was a grandson, and Martha Nibley Beck is a great-granddaughter.

See also

 Council on the Disposition of the Tithes
 David Asael Smith
 John Wells (Mormon)

Notes

External resources
Grampa Bill's G.A. Pages: Charles W. Nibley
Autobiography of Charles W. Nibley

1849 births
1931 deaths
Counselors in the First Presidency (LDS Church)
Presiding Bishops (LDS Church)
Scottish emigrants to the United States
Scottish Latter Day Saints
People from Brigham City, Utah
Deaths from pneumonia in Utah
People from Midlothian
Scottish general authorities (LDS Church)